Merhynchites bicolor, the rose curculio, is a species of leaf rolling weevil in the beetle family Attelabidae. It is found in North America.

Subspecies
These five subspecies belong to the species Merhynchites bicolor:
 Merhynchites bicolor bicolor
 Merhynchites bicolor cerdonis
 Merhynchites bicolor cockerelli Pierce, 1913
 Merhynchites bicolor niger Hamilton
 Merhynchites bicolor nigricephalus Hamilton, 1985

References

Further reading

 
 

Attelabidae
Articles created by Qbugbot
Beetles described in 1775
Taxa named by Johan Christian Fabricius